Polków-Daćbogi  is a village in the administrative district of Gmina Grębków, within Węgrów County, Masovian Voivodeship, in east-central Poland.

The village has a population of 109.

References

Villages in Węgrów County